Christmas Offerings is the seventh full-length album by the Christian rock band Third Day. It was released on October 17, 2006. "Away in a Manger", "Silent Night", "The First Noel" and "Do You Hear What I Hear" are all live versions. "Christmas Like a Child", "Born in Bethlehem", "Merry Christmas" and "Jesus, Light of the World" are original songs recorded in studio.

Track listing

Awards 

In 2007, the album won a Dove Award for Christmas Album of the Year at the 38th GMA Dove Awards.

Personnel 

Third Day
 Mac Powell – acoustic guitar, lead and backing vocals
 Brad Avery – guitars
 Mark Lee – guitars
 Tai Anderson – bass 
 David Carr – drums

Additional musicians
 Scotty Wilbanks – acoustic piano, keyboards, Hammond B3 organ
 Blaine Barcus – sleigh bells (5)
 Worldwide Groove Corporation – string arrangements (3, 4, 13)
 Brandon Brooks – cello (7, 8, 10)
 Pat Barrett – backing vocals 
 Don McCollister – backing vocals

Production 
 Terry Hemmings – executive producer
 Third Day – producers
 Don McCollister – producer, engineer, mixing
 Laura Harrington – assistant engineer
 Jonathan Medley – assistant engineer
 Kris Sampson – assistant engineer
 Tony Terrebonne – assistant engineer, additional engineer
 Craig White – string engineer (3, 4, 13)
 Hank Williams – mastering at MasterMix (Nashville, Tennessee)
 Blaine Barcus – A&R
 Michelle Pearson – A&R production
 Tai Anderson – art direction
 Stephanie McBrayer – art direction
 Tim Parker – art direction
 Stephanie Waldrop – art direction
 Bert Sumner – design 
 Robert Ascroft – photography
 Traci Sgrignoli – make-up, hair stylist

References 

Third Day albums
Essential Records (Christian) albums
2006 Christmas albums
Christmas albums by American artists